Esther Gulick (née Kaufmann, 29 March 1911 - 31 May 1995)  was a pioneer in environmentalism.  She, along with Kay Kerr and Sylvia McLaughlin, founded the Save San Francisco Bay Association  which eventually became 
Save The Bay.

She was referred to as an "impractical idealist," a "do-gooder" and a "posy-picker" but she is credited as a leader in environmentalism.

References

American naturalists
Activists from the San Francisco Bay Area
American conservationists
1995 deaths
1911 births
20th-century naturalists